Pelli Kanuka is a 1998 Telugu-language drama film, produced by Nannapaneni Anna Rao under the N. V. S. Creations banner and directed by Kodi Ramakrishna. The film stars Jagapati Babu, Lakshmi, Bhanumathi Ramakrishna with music composed by M. M. Keeravani. The film is a remake of the 1997 Hindi film Pardes. It was Bhanumathi’s last film appearance to date.

Plot
The film begins with Savitramma, an industrialist at Delhi, visiting her native village after many years. Currently, she meets her old family friend Sitaramaraju's family. During her stay in the conservative, she relishes the traditional culture and love of Sitaramaraju's daughter, Ganga. Accordingly, she desires to knit Ganga with her westernized grandson, Srinivasa Prasad / Chintu. Sitaramaraju's family accepts the proposal. Savitramma knows she will have a tough time convincing her grandson to nuptial. Hence, she assigns the task to her foster son, Sagar / Airport. Sagar lands in the village ahead of Chintu to set the stage for him to meet Ganga. Chintu arrives, and he also acts offensively; sometimes intentionally, and sometimes because he has no idea of anything Indians consider rude or inappropriate. But Sagar, despite his attraction to Ganga, smoothens the way out. In his determination to help the marriage come to pass, Sagar deceives Ganga about Chintu's character and also covers his bad habits.

After the engagement, the families agree that Ganga should come to Delhi before the wedding. Ganga arrives in Delhi and is hurt to hear her traditional dress and foreign manners are despised by Chintu's parents. In her new surroundings, her only friend and confidant are Sagar and she expands an inherent bond with him. Time being, Ganga realizes Chintu's wicked shade and breaks out before Sagar. Now, when she questions Chintu about this, he misbehaves with her, and Sagar revolts on Chintu. Here, Chintu manipulates and poses Sagar as an impostor before Savitramma. So, Savitramma excludes Sagar from the house to Agra. Afterward, Ganga decides to forbid the espousal and return to her village. Before leaving Chintu ploys, and takes her to Agra to show her favorite spot Taj Mahal. Therein, he tries to molest her but she escapes. Parallelly, Sagar also moves for her rescue, both of them meet near the Taj Mahal and back to the village. Before they reach, Chintu falsifies Ganga's family that Ganga eloped with Sagar. Being cognizant of it, Ganga's family assaults Sagar and surrenders Ganga to Chintu. During that plight, Savitramma arrives, brings out the reality, disowns her family, and accepts Sagar as her heir. Now, she decides to go ahead with Ganga's marriage to Sagar.

Cast
 Jagapati Babu as Sagar / Airport
 Lakshmi as Ganga
 Bhanumathi Ramakrishna as Savitramma
 Viren Chaudhury as Srinivasa Prasad / Chintu
 Sudhakar as Bholak Singh
 Mallikarjuna Rao as Sitaramaraju
 Pokula Narasimha Rao as Sitaramaraju's father
 John as Robert Kristopher / Ramakrishna
 Chalasani Krishna Rao as Venkanna (Chintu's father)
 Rajitha as Indira
 Radha Prasanthi as Lavanya (Chintu's mother)
 Indu Anand as Sitaramaraju's wife

Soundtrack

The music was composed by M.M. Keeravani with lyrics by Sirivennela Sitarama Sastry. The music was released on T Series Music Company.

Awards
Nandi Award for Best Female Comedian - Rajitha

References

External links

1998 films
1990s Telugu-language films
Indian romantic drama films
1998 romantic drama films
Films directed by Kodi Ramakrishna
Films scored by M. M. Keeravani
Films set in Delhi
Films shot in Delhi
Films set in Uttar Pradesh
Films shot in Uttar Pradesh
Telugu remakes of Hindi films